Timema knulli, Knull's Timema, is a stick insect native to California.

References

Phasmatodea